Cinema Opera and Ezzeddine Building is located in Beirut Central District, Lebanon.

Overview
Cinema Opera and Ezzedine building were the only two buildings on Martyrs’ Square to be retained after the Civil War. Both were restored in 2001.

Construction
In 1932, architect Bahjat Abdelnour designed the Cinema Opera building for deputy and businessman Abboud Abdel Razzak. The basement housed Cinema Rio, another popular movie theater operating until 1967.  The building displays an eclectic Art Deco style. Restored in 2001, the main features of the building, including the terraced balconies and stage, were retained. The Ezzedine building, adjacent to Cinema Opera, was the only other building on Martyrs’ Square to be retained after the Civil War (1975-1990). Formerly the Royal Hotel, it was restored in 2001 and its original dome was rebuilt.

History

In 1932, architect Bahjat Abdelnour designed the building for deputy and businessman Abboud Abdel Razzak. It derives its name from the Cinema Opera, inaugurated in November 1944 with the showing of the movie ‘The Constant Nymph, starring Charles Boyer and Jean Fonteyn. The basement of the building housed Cinema Rio, another popular movie theater operating until 1967.  The building displays the eclectic Art Deco style, manifest in the Neo-Egyptian motifs and round pilasters with capitals in limestone. The walls are decorated with horizontal dentils and successive recesses. The Art Deco style is also present in the geometric patterns of the wrought ironwork. When the building was restored in 2001, its main features, including the terraced balconies and stage, were retained. The Ezzedine building, next to Cinema Opera, was the only other building on Martyrs’ Square to be retained after the Civil War (1975-1990). Formerly the Royal Hotel, it was restored in 2001 and its original dome rebuilt. The former Cinema Opera is now a Virgin Megastore.

Timeline
1944: Inauguration of the Cinema Opera, designed by Bahjat Abdelnour. 

2001: Restoration of the Cinema Opera and Ezzedine Building (formerly the Royal Hotel), the only two buildings on Martyrs’ Square to be retained after the Civil War.

See also

 Art Deco
 Lebanese Civil War
 Martyr's Square

References 

Buildings and structures in Beirut
Monuments and memorials in Lebanon
Tourist attractions in Beirut
Theatres completed in 1932